Tre'shaun Albert Mann (born February 3, 2001) is an American professional basketball player for the Oklahoma City Thunder of the National Basketball Association (NBA). He played college basketball for the Florida Gators.

High school career
Mann played basketball for The Villages Charter Schools in The Villages, Florida. As a junior, he averaged 20 points and 5.6 rebounds per game, and suffered a torn meniscus in his right knee at the Class 5A-District 5 title game. In his senior season, Mann averaged 23.6 points and 4.9 rebounds per game, and was named Daily Commercial All-Area Player of the Year. He was selected to play in the McDonald's All-American Game and Jordan Brand Classic.

Recruiting
Mann was considered a five-star recruit by 247Sports and Rivals, and a four-star recruit by ESPN. On August 28, 2018, he committed to playing college basketball for Florida over offers from Kansas, Tennessee and North Carolina.

College career
In his first game in a Florida uniform, Mann had 11 points and four rebounds as the Gators defeated North Florida 74–59. He averaged 5.3 points per game as a freshman. Following the season he declared for the 2020 NBA draft. On July 7, 2020, Mann announced he was returning to Florida, in part due to the possibility to start at point guard.

In his sophomore season debut on December 2, 2020, Mann scored 19 points in a 76–69 win against Army. On March 12, 2021, he scored a career-high 30 points in a 78–66 loss to Tennessee at the SEC tournament quarterfinals. As a sophomore, Mann averaged 16 points, 5.6 rebounds, 3.5 assists and 1.4 steals per game, and was named First Team All-Southeastern Conference (SEC) by the league's coaches and Second Team All-SEC by the media. On March 24, he declared for the 2021 NBA draft, forgoing his remaining college eligibility.

Professional career
Mann was selected with the 18th pick in the 2021 NBA draft by the Oklahoma City Thunder. and on August 8, 2021, he signed a contract with the Thunder.

Career statistics

NBA

|-
| style="text-align:left;"| 
| style="text-align:left;"| Oklahoma City
| 60 || 26 || 22.8 || .393 || .360 || .793 || 2.9 || 1.5 || .8 || .2 || 10.4
|- class="sortbottom"
| style="text-align:center;" colspan="2"| Career
| 60 || 26 || 22.8 || .393 || .360 || .793 || 2.9 || 1.5 || .8 || .2 || 10.4

College

|-
| style="text-align:left;"| 2019–20
| style="text-align:left;"| Florida
| 29 || 4 || 17.8 || .356 || .275 || .655 || 1.9 || .7 || .6 || .1 || 5.3
|-
| style="text-align:left;"| 2020–21
| style="text-align:left;"| Florida
| 24 || 24 || 32.4 || .459 || .402 || .831 || 5.6 || 3.5 || 1.4 || .1 || 16.0
|- class="sortbottom"
| style="text-align:center;" colspan="2"| Career
| 53 || 28 || 24.4 || .422 || .349 || .788 || 3.6 || 1.9 || .9 || .1 || 10.2

References

External links
Florida Gators bio

2001 births
Living people
American men's basketball players
Basketball players from Gainesville, Florida
Florida Gators men's basketball players
McDonald's High School All-Americans
Oklahoma City Blue players
Oklahoma City Thunder draft picks
Oklahoma City Thunder players
Point guards